The 1980–81 New York Islanders season was the ninth season in the franchise's history. It involved winning the Stanley Cup.

Offseason

NHL Draft
New York's draft picks at the 1980 NHL Entry Draft held at the Montreal Forum in Montreal, Quebec.

Regular season
 January 24, 1981 - In a victory over the Quebec Nordiques, Mike Bossy became the second player in NHL history to score 50 goals in 50 games.

Season standings

Schedule and results

Pre-season

Regular season

Player statistics

Note: Pos = Position; GP = Games played; G = Goals; A = Assists; Pts = Points; +/- = plus/minus; PIM = Penalty minutes; PPG = Power-play goals; SHG = Short-handed goals; GWG = Game-winning goals
      MIN = Minutes played; W = Wins; L = Losses; T = Ties; GA = Goals-against; GAA = Goals-against average; SO = Shutouts;

Playoffs

Stanley Cup Finals
New York Islanders vs. Minnesota North Stars

Awards and records
 Butch Goring, Conn Smythe Trophy

References
 Islanders on Hockey Database

New York Islanders seasons
New York Islanders
New York Islanders
New York Islanders
New York Islanders
New York Islanders
Patrick Division champion seasons
Stanley Cup championship seasons
Western Conference (NHL) championship seasons